2016 Liberty Bowl can refer to:

 2016 Liberty Bowl (January), played as part of the 2015–16 college football bowl season between the Arkansas Razorbacks and the Kansas State Wildcats
 2016 Liberty Bowl (December), played as part of the 2016–17 college football bowl season between the Georgia Bulldogs and the TCU Horned Frogs